was a town located in Yazu District, Tottori Prefecture, Japan.

As of 2003, the town had an estimated population of 4,143 and a density of 50.77 persons per km2. The total area was 81.60 km2.

On November 1, 2004, Mochigase, along with the town of Kokufu, the village of Fukube (both from Iwami District), the towns of Aoya, Ketaka and Shikano (all from Ketaka District), the town of Kawahara, and the village of Saji (all from Yazu District), was merged into the expanded city of Tottori.

Mount Misumi is located within the former boundaries of Mochigase.

External links
Tottori City official website 

Dissolved municipalities of Tottori Prefecture
Tottori, Tottori